Talu is a village in the Bhiwani district of the Indian state of Haryana. , the village had 1,526 households with a population of 8,243 of which 4,469 were male and 3,774 female.

References

Villages in Bhiwani district